GameSamba is an American publisher of online games such as Star Trek: Alien Domain. Headquartered in Everett, Washington, GameSamba also operates offices in Hong Kong and Tokyo. In 2016, the company announced a strategic alliance with FUNimation, a content distributor specialized in bringing Japanese anime to North America.

History 
In 2015, GameSamba launched Star Trek: Alien Domain, an online strategy game, playable via web browser. It is an officially licensed Star Trek game published by GameSamba. It is set in the fluidic space where players can choose between two factions, the Klingon Empire and the United Federation of Planets.

In collaboration with the Japanese publishing company Kodansha, GameSamba is currently developing a browser game called Fairy Tail: Hero's Journey and a mobile game called Fairy Tail: Adventures, both based on the Japanese manga Fairy Tail. The development of a mobile game on the Japanese manga Attack on Titan was announced in March 2016.

The mobile game Tokyo Ghoul: Dark War, based on the Japanese seinen manga Tokyo Ghoul, is said to launch in 2018. The game is officially licensed by the Japanese animation studio Studio Pierrot.

Notable Games 
 Star Trek: Alien Domain
 Fairy Tail: Hero's Journey
 Tokyo Ghoul: Dark War
 18: Dream World
 Attack On Titan:Assault

References

External links 
 Official website

Video game publishers
Video game companies of the United States